The Robert Chadwell House is a historic mansion in Madison, Tennessee, USA. It was built circa 1874. It was designed in the Italianate architectural style. It has been listed on the National Register of Historic Places since November 13, 1989.

References

Houses on the National Register of Historic Places in Tennessee
Houses completed in 1874
Houses in Davidson County, Tennessee
National Register of Historic Places in Davidson County, Tennessee